Kayondo  is a surname. Notable people with the surname include: 

Aziz Kayondo (born 2002), Ugandan footballer
Hamu Kayondo (born 1990), Ugandan cricketer
Leila Kayondo (born 1988), Ugandan musician

Surnames of African origin